Zhang Town is a town on the east side of Shunyi District, Beijing. It borders Longwantun Town to the north, Yukou and Machangying Towns to the east, Dasungezhuang Town to the south, and Yang Town to the west. In the year 2020, its population was 24,795.

The town's name is referring to the town's origin as a settlement founded by people of the Zhang family during the Liao dynasty.

History

Administrative divisions 
As of 2021, Zhang Town was made up of 31 subdivisions, in which 2 were communities and 29 villages:

See also 

 List of township-level divisions of Beijing

References 

Towns in Beijing
Shunyi District